Naṉṉūl is a work on Tamil grammar written by a Jain ascetic Pavananthi Munivar around 13th century CE. It is the most significant work on Tamil grammar after Tolkāppiyam. The work credits Western Ganga vassal king Seeya Gangan of Kolar with patronising it.

About 20 commentaries have been written on Nannūl up to 19th century CE. Nannūl was divided into five sections: written language, spoken language, semantics, poetic language and rhetorical devices. The latter three sections have been lost, so only the parts on written and spoken language are extant today.

In Tamil, nal means good and nūl means book, so Nannūl means good book.

See also
 Karanthai Pavananthi munivar

References

External links
 nannUl of pavaNanti munivar, edited by Dr. T. Malten, Inst. of Indology and Tamil Studies, Univ of Koeln, Germany

Tamil-language literature

Grammar books